Louis Napoleon, Baron van der Goes van Dirxland (28 July 1806 in Loosduinen – 19 March 1885 in The Hague) was a Dutch politician and Ministers of Foreign Affairs of the Netherlands from 4 April 1860 until 14 January 1861.

1806 births
1885 deaths
Nobility from The Hague
Ministers of Foreign Affairs of the Netherlands
Independent politicians in the Netherlands
Politicians from The Hague
Leiden University alumni